Cristina Siekavizza (born 9 December 1977) is a Guatemala City mother of two children whose disappearance and possible murder by her husband early in July 2011 resulted in an extensive national news coverage focused on the connected issues of femicide and impunity.

Roberto Barreda (deceased on August 6, 2020 in Guatemala City) was the main suspect in the disappearance and possible murder of his wife, Cristina Siekavizza. The crime would have occurred on July 6, 2011 and the trial was expected to take place in April 2020. However, the Covid-19 pandemic has prevented its realization. The trial was later cancelled given Barreda’s death on August 6, 2020 from Covid-19.

In this case, Ofelia de León, Barreda's mother and former president of the Supreme Court of Justice, is also accused. Investigator Óscar José Celada Cuevas and Javier Armando Mendizábal Ruiz are also implicated, whom the MP accuses of hiding information about the disappearance of Cristina Siekavizza.

Investigations
The case was originally thought to be a kidnapping, and private investigators were hired to solve the case. After several weeks passed without a call from the alleged kidnappers, the case was turned over to the Guatemalan police. As the police began to investigate, they found incriminating evidence (traces of blood in the house) against Siekavizza's husband, Roberto Barreda de León. A housekeeper testified that there had been a violent domestic quarrel the evening before the woman's disappearance and that she had seen her lifeless body lying in one of the rooms.

Prosecution of the husband
In early August, before the housekeeper could even testify and while the search for Cristina Siekavizza was still going on, Roberto Barreda suddenly disappeared with the family's two children, Roberto José (age 7) and Maria Mercedes (age 4). An international warrant was issued for his arrest. In the meantime, three people were arrested on the suspicion of having aided the husband in removing the traces of the crime. On 21 October 2011, Barreda's mother, Beatriz Ofelia de León, ex-magistrate of the Supreme Court of Guatemala, was arrested for corruption of justice in the Siekavizza case. Barreda was finally caught in Mérida, Yucatán (Mexico) and extradited on 8 November 2013. Since then, his lawyers have consistently attempted to obstruct the course of justice, so that seven years after Siekavizza's disappearance, the process is still to begin, with the husband remaining in custody. In August it was announced that Barreda had passed away due to contracting Covid-19 in the San Juan Hospital in Guatemala.

Public protests against femicide
Siekavizza's disappearance, and possible murder, have moved Guatemalans to demand justice against a growing epidemic of femicide happening in their country. Siekavizza's family has organized marches throughout Guatemala City (Obelisco, Avenida Las Américas, carretera an El Salvador and Vista Hermosa) to support victims of domestic violence. Cristina Siekavizza's case has dominated the Guatemalan press since news of her disappearance went public.

See also
List of people who disappeared

References

1977 births
2010s missing person cases
Guatemalan victims of crime
Missing people
Missing person cases in Guatemala
Violence against women in Guatemala